Freirachdorf is an Ortsgemeinde – a community belonging to a Verbandsgemeinde – in the Westerwaldkreis in Rhineland-Palatinate, Germany. The community belongs to the Verbandsgemeinde of Selters, a kind of collective municipality.

Geography

Freirachdorf lies 1 km from Herschbach and 7 km from Selters (Westerwald).

History
In 1190, Freirachdorf had its first documentary mention. In 1972, in the course of municipal restructuring, the Verbandsgemeinde of Selters was founded, which Freirachdorf also joined.

Politics

The municipal council is made up of 12 council members, as well as the honorary and presiding mayor (Ortsbürgermeisterin), who were elected in a majority vote in a municipal election on 7 June 2009.

Economy and infrastructure

Businesses
Müsing, bicycle manufacturer

Transport
Southwest of the community runs Bundesstraße 413 leading from Bendorf to Hachenburg. The nearest Autobahn interchange is Dierdorf on the A 3 (Cologne–Frankfurt). The nearest InterCityExpress stop is the railway station at Montabaur on the Cologne-Frankfurt high-speed rail line.

References

External links
Freirachdorf in the collective municipality’s Web pages 

Municipalities in Rhineland-Palatinate
Westerwaldkreis